James, Jim, Jimmy or Jamie Reeves may refer to:
James Reeves (footballer) (1869–1937), English footballer who played in Spain
James Reeves (physician) (1829–1896), American physician
James Reeves (writer) (1909–1978), British writer 
Jimmy Reeves (1904–1974), American boxer
Jim Reeves (1923–1964), American country and popular music singer-songwriter
James J. Reeves (born 1938), member of the Florida House of Representatives
Jamie Reeves (footballer) (born 1953), football pundit and former footballer
Jamie Reeves (born 1962), former coal miner, strongman and professional wrestler
James Reeves (baseball) (born 1993), American pitcher
Nathan West (General Hospital) or James Nathan Reeves, a character from General Hospital

See also
James Reeve
Reeves (disambiguation)